"Nervous" is a 2015 song by Irish singer-songwriter Gavin James from his album Bitter Pill. The song is a ballad written by Gavin James became the fifth consecutive single from the album following "The Book of Love" (released in 2014), "For You", "Bitter Pill" and "22" (all three released in 2015). The song went Gold in the UK Singles Chart as Platinum in Ireland Belgium, the Netherlands, Gold in Norway and Sweden.

A music video was released directed by Christian Tierney.

Track listing
"Nervous" – 3:36
"Nervous" (Acoustic) – 4:11

"Nervous (The Ooh Song)"
In 2016, the Irish music producer, radio and club DJ Mark McCabe remixed the song. Retitled "Nervous (The Ooh Song) (Mark McCabe Remix)", it was released in June 2016 and found renewed international chart success, charting in Belgium and Sweden. A separate music video distinct from the original was released with the remix. The new video was directed by Raja Virdi and edited by Dylan Holmes Williams.

Charts

Weekly charts

Year-end charts

Certifications

References

2015 songs
2015 singles